James Cudjoe is one of Ghana's most successful contemporary artists. He has been growing in popularity since the start of his career.  Cudjoe was born on September 7, 1971, in Takoradi, Ghana.  He graduated from Ghana's private art college Ghanatta in 1996, and has since participated in seven highly successful national group and solo exhibitions.  Cudjoe operates his own galleries in Accra and Takoradi, Ghana.

James Cudjoe's work draws on images from everyday life.  He is known for his cityscapes, which range from vibrant, colorful and energetic (such as Hot Day (in Osu), see right) to calm, placid and subdued (such as New Beginnings I.  He is also known to depict the African market woman, a figure he says represents his own mother, in scenes of labor or rest, such as Dancer (see right), or the working woman of Good Returns III.  Fans of his work find these paintings evocative, emotional and relatable.  His growing popularity and success in Europe and the United States, as well as many other locations across the globe, is a testament to his skill and importance as an artist.

In May 2007, James Cudjoe was featured in an exhibition at the San Diego Museum of Man, Artists Speak: Contemporary art from Ghana and Zimbabwe. His work is considered to be illustrative of 3rd generation Ghanaian artists, who freely express themselves as artists in a modern world, without succumbing to restrictive notions of African Art.

Selected exhibitions

2004-National Theatre, Accra, Ghana

2003-Golden Tulip Hotel, Accra

2001-LA Palm Beach Hotel

2001-African Beach, Takoradi

2001-Shangrila Hotel

2000-Elmina Beach Resort, Elmina

2000-Art Centre National Exhibition

1998-Golden Tulip

1997-Arama Art Gallery, Accra

External links
African Encounters  James Cudjoe's west coast representatives
Gallery of selected James Cudjoe artwork
James Cudjoe biography by Ama de-Graft Aikins

1971 births
Living people
20th-century Ghanaian painters
20th-century male artists
Male painters
Ghanaian male artists
21st-century Ghanaian painters
21st-century male artists
People from Western Region (Ghana)